Scranton is an unincorporated community in Menifee County, Kentucky, United States.  It lies along Route 1274 northeast of the city of Frenchburg, the county seat of Menifee County.  Its elevation is 791 feet (241 m).

Scranton is part of the Mount Sterling Micropolitan Statistical Area.  It is named after the city of Scranton, Pennsylvania.

References

Unincorporated communities in Menifee County, Kentucky
Unincorporated communities in Kentucky
Mount Sterling, Kentucky micropolitan area